Mungaoli is a town and a nagar panchayat in Ashoknagar district in the Indian state of Madhya Pradesh.  It is situated on the Bina-Kota railway line. Ganesh Shankar Vidhyarti has taken the Education from Mungaoli. It is situated near the Historic Place Chanderi & Chanderi has just 38 km away from Mungaoli.

Geography
It has an average elevation of 472 metres (1,549 feet). Betwa River is only 5 km far from Mungaoli.

Demographics
 India census, Mungaoli had a population of 40,000. Males constitute 51% of the population and females 49%. Mungaoli has an average literacy rate of 69%, higher than the national average of 58.5%: male literacy is 74%, and female literacy is 58%. In Mungaoli, 20% of the population is under 2 years of age.

References

it has two jail one of the khulijail and one of the old jail

{manish prajapati localite own information}

Cities and towns in Ashoknagar district